Laborec may refer to:

 Laborec, an alleged ruler in the 9th century 
 Laborec Castle 
 Laborec 
 Laborec Highlands